Lev Fink (Russian: Лев Матве́eвич Финк, 1910–1988) was a Soviet physicist. He was a Doktor nauk in Telecommunication.

He was born in Kiev, at the time part of the Russian Empire.

He died in Leningrad a few years before the collapse of the Soviet Union.

1910 births
1988 deaths
Engineers from Kyiv
Soviet engineers
Soviet physicists
Burials at Serafimovskoe Cemetery
20th-century Ukrainian engineers
Ukrainian physicists